Nellihudikeri is a village in Kodagu district, Karnataka, India.

Villages in Kodagu district